South Dakota Public Broadcasting (SDPB) is a state network of non-commercial educational television and radio stations serving the U.S. state of South Dakota. The stations are operated by the South Dakota Bureau of Information and Telecommunication, an agency of the state government which holds the licenses for all of the PBS and NPR member stations licensed in South Dakota except KRSD in Sioux Falls, which is owned and run by Minnesota Public Radio, and KAUR in Sioux Falls, which is owned by Augustana University and operated by MPR. SDPB's studios and offices are located in the Al Neuharth Media Center on the campus of the University of South Dakota in Vermillion.

History
Educational broadcasting in South Dakota began in 1919 with experimental broadcasts at USD's College of Engineering. USD was granted a full license in 1922, and went on the air that May 29 as WEAJ. It became KUSD in 1925. By 1952, the station settled at 690 AM at 1,000 watts, operating only during daylight hours to protect CBF in Montreal. In 1967, it acquired an FM sister station, KUSD-FM at 89.7. Also in 1967, South Dakota State University in Brookings signed on KESD-FM. The three stations merged in 1982 as South Dakota Public Radio.

On July 5, 1961, KUSD-TV signed on the air as the state's first educational television station. Seven more stations signed on from 1967 to 1975, extending its reach to parts of Minnesota and Iowa.

South Dakota Public Radio merged with the State Board of Directors for Educational Television, which operated the television network, in 1985 to form South Dakota Public Broadcasting under the ownership of the Bureau of Information and Telecommunication. Between 1985 and 1991, five other stations joined the radio network. One of them was KCSD, which signed on in 1985 as part of a partnership between Sioux Falls College (now the University of Sioux Falls) and the ETV Board in an effort to improve the network's reception in South Dakota's largest city. Until 2013, KCSD's license was held by the University of Sioux Falls and operated by the state network under a management agreement. The network bought KCSD outright in 2013.

In 1992, a Chevrolet Suburban was taken on a joyride through the Vermillion Golf Course, where KUSD (AM)'s towers were located. The Suburban crashed into one of the AM station's towers and knocked it down. While a judge ordered the suspect to pay $48,000, the insurance settlement was not large enough to restore full operations, and KUSD (AM) went off the air for good in 1994.

KUSD-TV's signal had long been spotty in parts of Sioux Falls, even though the channel 2 analog signal traveled a very long distance under normal conditions. Some parts of the area didn't get a clear signal from KUSD-TV until cable gained more penetration in the 1980s. To solve this problem, KCSD-TV signed on in 1995, significantly improving coverage in the state's largest city.

As of February 2017, SDPR now broadcasts the main network over the fifth subcarrier of the SDPB Television stations, and classical music (which airs on the radio stations' second HD channel) on the television stations' sixth subcarrier.

Radio stations
South Dakota Public Radio airs a mix of news and talk from NPR, Public Radio International (PRI), American Public Media (APM), the BBC World Service and other sources. Stations in the lineup include:

Notes:

South Dakota Public Radio also rebroadcasts on the following translator stations:

In March 2007, South Dakota Public Radio started broadcasting on HD Radio.

Television stations
Television stations included in the state network are:

Notes:
1. KPSD-TV used the callsign KLGC during its construction permit from April 25 to August 28, 1973.

Translators
The television programming from SDPB is also rebroadcast on the following low-power translator stations:

Digital television

Subchannels
The digital signals of SDPB's TV stations are multiplexed:

Analog-to-digital conversion
During 2009, in the lead-up to the analog-to-digital television transition that would ultimately occur on June 12, SDPB shut down the analog transmitters of its stations on a staggered basis. Listed below are the dates each analog transmitter ceased operations as well as their post-transition channel allocations:
 KUSD-TV shut down its analog signal, over VHF channel 2, on February 17, 2009, the original date in which full-power television stations in the United States were to transition from analog to digital broadcasts under federal mandate (which was later pushed back to June 12, 2009). The station's digital signal remained on its pre-transition UHF channel 34. Through the use of PSIP, digital television receivers display the station's virtual channel as its former VHF analog channel 2.
 KBHE-TV shut down its analog signal, over VHF channel 9, on February 17, 2009. The station's digital signal remained on its pre-transition UHF channel 26. Through the use of PSIP, digital television receivers display the station's virtual channel as its former VHF analog channel 9.
 KCSD-TV shut down its analog signal, over UHF channel 23, on February 17, 2009. The station's digital signal remained on its pre-transition UHF channel 24. Through the use of PSIP, digital television receivers display the station's virtual channel as its former UHF analog channel 23.
 KDSD-TV shut down its analog signal, over UHF channel 16, on February 17, 2009. The station's digital signal remained on its pre-transition UHF channel 17. Through the use of PSIP, digital television receivers display the station's virtual channel as its former UHF analog channel 16.
 KESD-TV shut down its analog signal, over VHF channel 8, on February 17, 2009. The station's digital signal relocated from its pre-transition UHF channel 18 to VHF channel 8 for post-transition operations.
 KPSD-TV shut down its analog signal, over VHF channel 13, on June 12, 2009, the official date in which full-power television stations in the United States transitioned from analog to digital broadcasts under federal mandate. The station's digital signal relocated from its pre-transition UHF channel 25 to VHF channel 13 for post-transition operations.
 KQSD-TV shut down its analog signal, over VHF channel 11, on February 17, 2009. The station's digital signal relocated from its pre-transition UHF channel 15 to VHF channel 11 for post-transition operations.
 KTSD-TV shut down its analog signal, over VHF channel 10, on February 17, 2009. The station's digital signal relocated from its pre-transition UHF channel 21 to VHF channel 10 for post-transition operations.
 KZSD-TV shut down its analog signal, over VHF channel 8, on February 17, 2009. The station's digital signal relocated from its pre-transition UHF channel 23 to VHF channel 8 for post-transition operations.

Programming
Although SDPB provides PBS programming, it also produces original programs such as:

Dakota Life — a magazine show focusing on South Dakota life.
A Falconer's Memoir (2000)
Images of the Past — a series about South Dakota's history as documented in photographs, film, and video.
Kids' Quest — an educational series for students.
Nature Adventures — a series about wildlife in South Dakota.
No Cover No Minimum — a series showing live performances of South Dakota music groups and solo acts such as Big Head Todd and the Monsters, Judd Hoos, and Chancey Williams and the Younger Brothers Band.
On Call Television — a show which discusses medical topics.
South Dakota Focus — a panel discussion show.
Statehouse — a show which focuses on the South Dakota State Legislature.

SDPB has also produced educational programs, such as:
The Badlands: Nature's Time Capsule — a multimedia project about Badlands National Park.
By The People, For The People — a series about government in South Dakota.
Dakota Pathways — a series about the history of South Dakota.
Draw With Me with Diana Tollefson — a South Dakota educational series about art.
Infinite Variety — a series about the geography and environment of South Dakota.
Our Statehouse: A Capitol Idea — a multimedia project about the history of the South Dakota Capitol.
South Dakota Adventure — a series about the history and culture of South Dakota.

SDPB has also syndicated educational programs, such as:
Once Upon a Time — a children's show produced by Nebraska ETV in the 1980s which focused on children's reading.

References

External links

Official website

Television stations in South Dakota

PBS member networks
NPR member networks
Radio stations established in 1922
1922 establishments in South Dakota
Television channels and stations established in 1961
1961 establishments in South Dakota